Mhaw Palin is a 2021 Burmese horror drama television series. It aired on MRTV-4, from January 27 to March 4, 2021, on Mondays to Fridays at 19:00 for 26 episodes.

Cast
Han Htoo Zan as Satkyar
Myat Thu Thu as Sandara
Zu Zu Zan as Pan Myat
May Akari Htoo as Phyu Lay
Kyaw Htet as Maung Min
Kaung Myat as Nay Pyin

References

Burmese television series
MRTV (TV network) original programming